Wot Rock ( Étarik or Monument Rock ) is a small uninhabited islet in the Pacific Ocean, a part of the Shepherd Islands archipelago in the Shefa Province of Vanuatu. Wot is located close to Emae Island.

References

Islands of Vanuatu
Shefa Province
Uninhabited islands of Vanuatu